Teresa Claramunt (1862–1931) was a Catalan anarcho-syndicalist. She was a textile employee and founded an anarchist group in Sabadell influenced by Fernando Tarrida de Mármol, which participated in a strike of seven weeks of 1883 where was claimed a dayjob of 10 hours a day. On October 1884 was one of the founders of the workers Section variant of anarcho-collectivists in Sabadell (Secció Vària de Treballadores Anarco-col·lectivistes de Sabadell).

In 1892, with Ángela Lopez de Ayala and Amàlia Domingo they promoted the first Spanish feminist society, the Women Autonomous Society of Barcelona (Sociedad Autónoma de Mujeres de Barcelona)

She was arrested after the bombing at the Gran Teatre del Liceu in Barcelona in 1893 and again during the repression of Montjuïc (Procés de Montjuïc) (1896), during which she was brutally beaten. She felt the effects of that beating for the rest of her life. Although she was not convicted of any crime, after the trial she was confined to England until 1898. She founded the magazine El Productor  (The Producer) (1901) and actively participated in the social demands of the early twentieth century. She contributed to La Tramuntana and La Revista Blanca magazine and directed the  El Rebelde newspaper in 1907-1908.

In 1902 she took part in rallies in solidarity with the strikers of the metal sector and in the general strike of February 1902. She was arrested again after the events of the Setmana Tràgica (Tragic Week) in August 1909 and confined in Zaragoza, where in 1911 she helped local unions boost membership of the CNT and the general strike of 1911, which brought her a new prison. Already very ill and confined between bed and chair, police searched her apartment after the attack on the cardinal Juan Soldevilla y Romero in Zaragoza on 4 June 1923, seeking evidence that she was guilty of it. In 1924 she returned to Barcelona, but the paralysis gradually distanced from their public activities.

References

External links
  Ajuntament de Sabadell, Biography of Teresa Claramunt Creus
  Gran Enciclopèdia Catalana, Teresa Claramunt
  Biography in Diccionari Biogràfic de Dones

1862 births
1932 deaths
Anarchists from Catalonia
Anarcho-syndicalists
People from Sabadell